Whyte is a British bicycle designer established in 1999. The bicycles are manufactured for Whyte in Taiwan. and then distributed to shops in the UK and Europe and the rest of the world.
Whyte's first bike back in 1999 was a full suspension machine and had a girder fork with twin wishbones, with a main frame made of two halves welded down the middle, and used Fox shocks for both fork and swingarm. The prototype's appearance was likened to Preston the robot dog of Wallace and Gromit fame, which later gave the production bike its name, the PRST-1. 
As of 2021 the range comprises Childrens/Youth, Commuter, Gravel, Road, XC, Trail, and Enduro ranges, with E-bike versions in several of these categories.

The RD7 range is a road bike but with disc brakes and a more relaxed design, named after UK counties and places. A common frame is used on all models: the wheel set, forks, group set and brakes are changed as the price increases.

Whyte continues to collect awards for their designs, which are always on the pulse with current trends in geometry and equipment, backed up by superb value for money and after sales service. Whyte also have their own line in accessories, some designed specifically to fit their bikes, including mudguards, saddles, grips, and handle bars.

In 2019, Whyte won a court case against British drinks company Rich Energy, regarding the potential theft of their stag logo.

References

External links

Mountain bike manufacturers
Cycle manufacturers of the United Kingdom